The Fort Worth Rangers were a minor professional ice hockey franchise based in Fort Worth, Texas. They played in the American Hockey Association (AHA) during the 1941-42 season and in the United States Hockey League (USHL) from 1945-46 to 1948-49. They played home games in the Will Rogers Memorial Center.

History
The Rangers were granted a franchise to play in the AHA for 1941-42 season, but they were only able to play in that one season before the AHA ceased play as a result of World War II. The league was resurrected for the 1945-46 season as the USHL, where Rangers played for four seasons until the team folded after the 1948-49 season.

The team's most successful seasons on the ice were the 1946–47 and 1947-48 seasons, when they finished the season in second place. The team folded after the 1948-49 season because of travel expenses.

Coaches
1941-42: Gene Carrigan
1945-46: Eddie Shore 
1946-47: Wally Kilrea
1947-49: Gordon Savage

Notable players

Gordie Bell 
Paul Bibeault 
Tony Bukovich 
Gene Carrigan 
Bert Connelly 
Chuck Corrigan 
Bill Cupolo 
Joffre Desilets 
Tommy Filmore 
Tom Fowler
Harry Frost 
Bill Gooden 
Walter "Red" Jackson
Vern Kaiser 
Francis Kane 
Ken Kilrea
Russ Kopak 
Pete Leswick 
George Pargeter
Bert Peer 
Ray Powell
Alex Ritson 
Al Rittinger 
Bill Summerhill
Gordon Tottle  
Bill Warwick 
Don Webster

References

American Hockey Association (1926–1942) teams
Defunct ice hockey teams in Texas
Ice hockey teams in the Dallas–Fort Worth metroplex